Screven is a city in Wayne County, Georgia, United States. The population was 766 at the 2010 census.  Although it was a railroad town as early as 1847, it was not officially chartered until August 19, 1907.

History
The Georgia General Assembly incorporated Screven as a town in 1907.

Geography
Screven is located at  (31.485008, −82.016305).

Demographics

As of the census of 2000, there were 702 people, 291 households, and 196 families residing in the city. The racial makeup of the city was 58.12% White, 39.60% African American, 0.28% Native American, 1.85% from other races, and 0.14% from two or more races. Hispanic or Latino of any race were 2.14% of the population.

There were 291 households, out of which 30.9% had children under the age of 18 living with them, 50.5% were married couples living together, 14.1% had a female householder with no husband present, and 32.6% were non-families. 30.9% of all households were made up of individuals, and 12.0% had someone living alone who was 65 years of age or older.  The average household size was 2.41 and the average family size was 3.05.

In the city, the population was spread out, with 27.1% under the age of 18, 7.3% from 18 to 24, 24.4% from 25 to 44, 27.9% from 45 to 64, and 13.4% who were 65 years of age or older.  The median age was 39 years. For every 100 females, there were 92.9 males.  For every 100 females age 18 and over, there were 91.0 males.

The median income for a household in the city was $25,714, and the median income for a family was $31,250. Males had a median income of $29,750 versus $20,536 for females. The per capita income for the city was $18,308.  About 12.8% of families and 18.8% of the population were below the poverty line, including 23.1% of those under age 18 and 15.4% of those age 65 or over.

References

Cities in Georgia (U.S. state)
Cities in Wayne County, Georgia